Sándor Gellér (12 July 1925 – 13 March 1996) was a Hungarian Olympic football player who played goalkeeper. He was Jewish, and was born in Veseuș, Romania.

He was part of the Hungarian national team at the 1952 Summer Olympics in Helsinki, Finland, but he did not play in any matches. He played with Budapesti Vörös Lobogó between 1954 and 1955, and in the 1954 FIFA World Cup for Hungary.

See also
List of select Jewish football (association; soccer) players

References

External links
Soccer: technique, tactics, coaching, Árpád Csanádi, Corvina Press, 1972
From goals to guns: the golden age of soccer in Hungary, 1950–1956, Andrew Handler, East European Monographs, 1994, 

1925 births
Hungarian footballers
Hungary international footballers
1996 deaths
Olympic footballers of Hungary
Footballers at the 1952 Summer Olympics
Olympic gold medalists for Hungary
Olympic medalists in football
1954 FIFA World Cup players
MTK Budapest FC players
Jewish footballers
Hungarian Jews
Association football goalkeepers
Medalists at the 1952 Summer Olympics